Homens de Bem is a 2011 Brazilian television film directed by Jorge Furtado and starring Rodrigo Santoro.

Synopsis 
Ciba (Rodrigo Santoro) is an independent investigator who works together with the police. A typical fallible hero who struggles with strong personal issues, while preventing crime and injustice. His partner, Deputy Ulisses (Luis Miranda), is a well-meaning professional who recognizes the difficulty in securing his function using only common artifacts, and Ciba's unofficial contact is of utmost importance for the progress of his investigations.

Ciba's role is never revealed or commented upon by her friends and family. Everything is meticulously planned so your actions do not endanger the life of your beloved daughter, Mariana (Juliana Moretti), a sweet and sensitive girl. His mother, Mary (Débora Falabella), is a woman of doubtful character who does not pass much confidence to the protagonist.

To fulfill a secretive and dangerous mission, Ciba must win the respect and confidence of Deputy Ricardo (Fulvio Stefanini) and filming him receiving a suitcase full of dirty money. In addition, Ciba will have to use all his talent and charm to dodge a parallel investigation of Agent Cristina (Virginia Cavendish), who works for the police, but knows nothing.

Cast 
Rodrigo Santoro	...	Ciba
Débora Falabella	...	Mary
Luis Miranda	...	Ulisses
Virginia Cavendish	...	Cristina
Fúlvio Stefanini	...	Ricardo
Juliana Moretti	...	Mariana
Guilherme Weber	...	Cesar
Tonico Pereira	...	Corvo
Marcos Verza	...	Elvis

References

External links 
 Homens de Bem on IMDb

Rede Globo original programming
Brazilian television films